Ragini MMS is a 2011 Indian found footage horror film directed by Pawan Kripalani and produced by Jeetendra and Shobha Kapoor of Balaji Telefilms. It was released on 13 May 2011 (Friday the 13th). The film is inspired by the 2007 American supernatural horror film Paranormal Activity and is partly based on the real story of a girl from Delhi named Deepika.

Plot 

The whole movie is shot like a homemade movie, starting with Uday arriving at Ragini's home.  After asking Uday where they were heading and getting no response, Ragini's friend Pia gets upset and wants Uday to leave their house immediately. Uday pays no heed to her, wakes Ragini up from her sleep, and tells her to get ready for their weekend getaway. They then travel the whole day by car and arrive at Uday's 'house'- a mysterious abandoned place at a deserted location. Ragini's mom calls her to ask about her whereabouts, but Ragini lies and cuts the call. It is revealed that Uday is involved in the hideous business of making and selling sex tapes of innocent girls. This time, he has Ragini, who thinks that he loves her, but in reality he is misusing her trust to make money. They try to eat dinner that they brought with them, but gets thrown out after seeing insects. They move to the bedroom in an attempt to have sex but are interrupted by Pia and her boyfriend Vishal visiting them. Furious by their visit, Uday tells Ragini to get rid of them, but end up staying for a while. After sometime, Vishal asks Uday for the way to the bathroom and Uday tells him. Seeing that the corridor leading to the bathroom is dark, Vishal tells Uday that a woman previously lived in the house. She was called a witch by her family who killed her, following which her spirit murdered her entire family and since then has been haunting the house. Uday laughs at this preposition thinking that it's a joke and walks away. Vishal hesitantly makes his way back to the living room but senses someone behind him. He then finds a door, opens it, and goes through. Someone knocks on the main door. When Uday opens, Vishal stumbles in as if he fell down and has a wound on his neck. Sensing that something is wrong with the house, Pia and Vishal leave in a hurry. Afterwards, Uday turns on the cameras without informing Ragini and handcuffs her to the bed. They are about to have sex but Uday is pulled away by his hair by someone and gets a scratch on his neck. He checks the whole house during which the same door opens inexplicably (which Vishal had gone through). However, Uday closes it and leaves, but the door opens up again. Now afraid on returning to the bedroom, he checks the room and house thoroughly but finds no one. They hear some strange sounds and Uday says in Marathi, "I am not a witch". He again goes out to check the source of the noise. He returns in a strange, frightful condition and is blood-stained. Ragini instantly asks him to open up her hands but Uday is scared and unable to think. She is terribly frightened by the thought of some provoked evil spirit at this hour of night and begs Uday to unlock the handcuffs. While searching for the keys, Uday eventually drops his bag which was covering the camera which Ragini sees. She eventually finds out that Uday was filming a sex tape with her, to which she reacts with terror, shock and anger. Meanwhile, Uday tries to open her handcuffs with other items but suddenly he becomes paranoid. Suddenly, Uday picks up a pointed object and stabs himself in the neck and dies. Terrified, Ragini screams for help but no one hears her. She tries to search for the keys in vain. She tries to break the bed post but fails. The whole night and the next day passes and she stays tied unable to open her cuffs. She then finds a piece of glass and cuts her hand to use the blood as a lubricant to break free. Once released, she tries to escape from the house, but the doors keep closing on her. She screams for help and some guys who are passing by are unable to help her as they can't enter the house due to locked doors and window bars. She is pulled into the same closet door where she finds a dead body. Somehow, she makes a run for the car. Upon finding it, she sees Vishal's dead body. She breaks open the car's window, pulls Vishal's body out but could not start the car. She again runs through the jungle and hides in a spot where she finds Pia's body. Eventually the spirit pulls her by her hair and back into the house. She sits there and the spirit hangs her to a wall for many days. The film ends in a way that is left for interpretation. In the end, it is shown that a guy found Ragini unconscious and she had to undergo psychiatric treatment for 10 months. The story is open ended and acts as a warning for naive girls to be extra cautious when dealing with shady people.

Cast
 Kainaz Motivala as Ragini
 Rajkummar Rao as Uday
 Rajat Paul as Vishal saxena 
 Janice as Piya
 Shernaz as Neha
 Vinod Rawat as Jigar
 Harshraj Shroff as Friend 1
 Cristy Philips as Friend 2
 M. Ravichandran Thevar as Friend 3
 Mangala White as Ghost Spirit

Production
The film was originally titled Raginni MMS but a numerologist advised Ekta Kapoor to change it to Ragini MMS. The film took only 25 days to shoot. A total of six cameras were used to shoot the film including a Canon 7D, an Arri Alexa and a Handycam. The size of the total footage shot was around 2.5 terabytes.

Release
The film had a midnight première on 13 May 2011 in Pune. The film opened to a very good response in its first week, grossing  77.5 million. It was steady during its second week and grossed  99.4 million at the end of its second week. The film recovered its cost within two days of release.

Reception
Upon release, the film met with mixed reviews.

Taran Adarsh from Bollywood Hungama gave it 4/5 stars and called it a "creepy, spine-chilling date movie" saying, "Ragini MMS amalgamates components of horror, paranormal and sex seamlessly. It titillates, it petrifies, but most importantly, it tells you a story which is daunting, imaginative and unconventional." 
Naresh Deoshi from Apunka Choice also gave the film 4/5 stars calling it "a damn scary film!"

Ankur Pathak from Rediff.com gave the film 3.5/5 stars and said "Ekta Kapoor's new film is terrifyingly real, and immensely watchable for the cold fright it inspires. She must be lauded for relying on young actors, and believing in the risky attempt of largely untouched storytelling."

Nikhat Kazmi from the Times of India gave the film 3.5/5 stars as well. She said "...Ragini MMS makes a heady cocktail of sex and horror that's so very different from run-of-the-mill Bollywood."

Shubha Shetty-Saha gave the film a good review of 3/5 and said "some scenes were so scary, that I actually wanted to run out of the theatre."

Mayank Shekhar from the Hindustan Times gave the film 2/5 stars, while Pankaj Sabnani from Glamsham gave the film an average review of 2.5/5 saying "Ragini MMS isn't worth 'circulating', if you have a large appetite for horror."

Aniruddha Guha from DNA gave the film 2/5 saying, "Watch Ragini MMS only if you dig cheap thrills. But don't worry about losing sleep thereafter."

Awards
Best Searchlight Film – Ekta Kapoor

Soundtrack

The music is composed by S. D. Burman, Shamir Tandon, Faizan Hussain, Agnel Roman, and Bappi Lahiri. The soundtrack for the film was released on 19 April 2011. It consists of only four songs, including the hit song "Raat Akeli Hai" from the 1967 film, Jewel Thief. Erik Satie's Gymnopedie No. 1 is also heard in pieces in this film.

Track listing

Home media and television
The movie was released on VCD and DVD. Satellite distribution rights were given to Hindi general entertainment channel Sahara One.

Sequel
A sequel to the movie, Ragini MMS 2 was made and released on 21 March 2014. Continuing the story, the sequel focused on a film crew who went back to the haunted house to shoot a film on the infamous Ragini MMS scandal. It was directed by Bhusan Patel.

See also
 Found footage (pseudo-documentary)

References

External links
 
 

2011 films
2011 horror films
2010s Hindi-language films
Films scored by Bappi Lahiri
Films scored by S. D. Burman
Films scored by Shamir Tandon
Films shot in India
Indian erotic horror films
Found footage films
Indian haunted house films
Indian ghost films
Balaji Motion Pictures films